Spore Bot Parts Pack, also known as the Dr Pepper Parts Pack, is a promotional expansion pack for the multigenre game Spore, developed by Maxis Emeryville and published by Electronic Arts. Bot Parts introduces 14 new robotic parts usable by players in the creature editor of Spore, or in the standalone version of the editor, Spore Creature Creator. The expansion was released on 1 January 2010 as part of a promotion run by the soft drink company Dr Pepper; download codes were available on bottles released in the United States throughout 2010. The expansion generated some controversy due to causing some installation issues and only being available in the United States.

Content 
The Bot Parts Pack includes 14 "mech-styled" parts, such as new heads, eyes and arms, for the creature editor of Spore. The new parts give players the ability to create creatures that are entirely mechanical in appearance, as well as cyborgs since they are usable together with the organic body parts already in the game.

Release 
The Bot Parts Pack was released on 1 January 2010 through a promotion with the soft drink company Dr Pepper. Through a partnership with Electronic Arts, Dr Pepper launched a promotion where they released unique downloadable content through including codes on certain Dr Pepper bottles. These codes could be redeemed on the Dr Pepper website, where recipients could choose their system and for which game they wanted content from an available list. In addition to Spore, the promotion also included content for Battlefield: Bad Company 2, Battlefield Heroes, Mass Effect 2, and The Sims 3. Additional games that would receive content through the partnership with Dr Pepper were also set to be announced throughout 2010.

The release of Bot Parts as a promotion with Dr Pepper was lampooned by some commentators as a desperate attempt by Dr Pepper to cater to "that critical gaming demographic". The codes were available on bottles from 1 January to 31 March 2010, and then again from 1 July to 31 December 2010. The Dr Pepper promotion only ran in the United States, which meant that the expansion was unavailable in other countries, garnering some criticism.

The parts introduced by the Bot Parts Pack could be redeemed and used both in the full Spore game and in standalone creature editor Spore Creature Creator. Bot Parts introduced issues to the game if installed before the previously released expansion Galactic Adventures, prompting players to patch the game while also hindering them from doing so. Players who installed Bot Parts before Galactic Adventures were consequently forced to uninstall the game entirely and then reinstall with the expansions in the order of their release.

References 

2010 video games
Biological simulation video games
Electronic Arts games
Keurig Dr Pepper
MacOS games
Maxis Sim games
North America-exclusive video games
Science fiction video games
Spore (2008 video game)
Video game expansion packs
Windows games
Video games developed in the United States